Poor Creek is a stream in Cape Girardeau County in the U.S. state of Missouri. It is a tributary to Hughes Creek.

Poor Creek supposedly was so named on account of the impoverished settlers along its course.

See also
List of rivers of Missouri

References

Rivers of Cape Girardeau County, Missouri
Rivers of Missouri